Ta Prohm Kel or Prohm Kel (Khmer: ប្រាសាទតាព្រហ្មកិល ឬ ព្រហ្មកិល) is a small ruined sandstone monument in Angkor archaeological park, Siem Reap province, Cambodia.

Ta Prohm Kel was one of the 102 hospital chapels, some of which were already in existence, by King Jayavarman VII all over the empire. The sanctuary opened to the east and had false doors on the other three sides. It was preceded by a small sandstone gopura a little to the east of which traces remain. The decoration is in the style of the Bayon, with devatas and small roundels enclosing figures. A somasutra or channel for draining lustral water out of the shrine, existed through the north wall of the sanctuary.

See also 
 Angkor Thom
 Bayon 
 Neak Poan
 Jayavarman VII
 Traditional Cambodian medicine

References 

Angkorian sites in Siem Reap Province